The 1974–75 season was Port Vale's 63rd season of football in the Football League, and their fifth successive season (11th overall) in the Third Division. It was Roy Sproson's first full season in charge. With cross-town rivals Stoke City competing in Europe and running close for the First Division title, Vale's attendances waned, as they were the third least-supported club in the division. This was despite a promotion challenging season that eventually ended with a sixth-place finish. Vale exited both cup competitions in the opening rounds.

Overview

Third Division
The pre-season saw Roy Sproson attempt to construct a new attacking style by signing attacking midfielder Terry Bailey from Stafford Rangers for £2,500, winger Frank Sharp from Grimsby Town, and goalkeeper John Connaughton from Sheffield United. There was also a dispute with John Woodward who asked for a transfer after a disagreement over his contract; Sproson said "he is trying to hold us to ransom and we are not having that".

The season opened with two Bailey goals, though Vale would have to wait until their fourth match for a victory, at which point their coffers were boosted by £10,000 following Sammy Morgan's success at Aston Villa. In September, Sproson made a £10,000 bid for Keith Leonard that was rejected. Instead he brought in young left-back Garry Dulson on loan from Nottingham Forest, and later bought him permanently for £5,000, using another £5,400 Villa were forced to pay Vale after Morgan hit another target. The "Valiants" proved difficult to beat, and heading into Christmas they won six of their last nine league games. Their 4–0 win over Huddersfield Town lifted them into third place, though attendances were still below 4,000. A 3–1 win over Southend United at Roots Hall then put the club into second spot, at which point Bob Mountford was sold to Rochdale for £2,000. A four-day holiday in Benidorm in the new year did not seem to help the Vale, as three straight defeats followed to drag them down the table. To halt the slide Sproson bought striker Derek Brownbill from Liverpool for £5,000. Two sendings off in a 3–1 defeat at Leeds Road – John Brodie also managed to break his leg in the challenge that earned him a red card – forced Sproson to defend his team after that took the Vale's red card tally to seven for the season. Nevertheless, a solid spell put Vale back into the promotion race by March, though their form dropped off again, and their hopes were crushed completely on 26 April with a 3–1 defeat at home to Gordon Lee's champions-elect Blackburn Rovers.

They finished in sixth place with 51 points, leaving them four points shy of promoted Charlton Athletic. Just two home losses were matched by only three victories on the road. The three main scorers were Ray Williams (14), Terry Bailey (14), and Brian Horton (13). At the end of the season the players took a break in Malta, where they drew 1–1 with Floriana. Tommy McLaren spent the summer in Oregon, playing for the Portland Timbers.

Finances
On the financial side, a loss was made of £16,964 despite donations of £13,803 from the development funds. The supporters group also paid £1,200 for video equipment, allowing the club to record games and show players their mistakes. The average home attendance of 4,346 was the third-lowest in the division. Wages stood at £72,874, gate receipts took in £43,199, and there was a loss in the transfer market of £6,000. The financial situation meant that seven players were released and thirteen were retained. Amongst those departing were: John Woodward (Scunthorpe United); Frank Sharp (Northwich Victoria); Roy Cross (Nuneaton Borough); Bill Summerscales (Rochdale); and Reg Edwards (Brereton Social).

Cup competitions
In the FA Cup, Vale lost their First Round Replay 2–0 at Lincoln City's Sincil Bank, following a 2–2 draw in Burslem. Dulson scored an own goal in the original match and was sent off in the replay for punching Dick Krzywicki.

In the League Cup, Vale left the competition at the first stage with a 1–0 defeat at Fourth Division Northampton Town's Sixfields Stadium.

League table

Results
Port Vale's score comes first

Football League Third Division

Results by matchday

Matches

FA Cup

League Cup

Player statistics

Appearances

Top scorers

Transfers

Transfers in

Transfers out

Loans in

Loans out

References
Specific

General

Port Vale F.C. seasons
Port Vale